Ankazoabo is a town in Atsimo-Andrefana Region, Madagascar and the capital of the district with the same name Ankazoabo (district).

An airport serves the town.

References 

Populated places in Atsimo-Andrefana